Topličane is a settlement in the Suva Reka municipality in the disputed region of Kosovo. It lies 413 m above sea level. It has an ethnic Albanian majority, and Serbian minority; in the 1981 census, it had 307 inhabitants. It has been registered with Lešane in the censuses.

Notes

References

Villages in Suva Reka